Mohammed Ghareeb (born July 22, 1980) is a tennis player from Kuwait. He plays right-handed with a single-handed backhand.

Career
Unranked in singles as of February 2018, with a career-high ranking of No. 336 in 2006. In August 2016, Al Ghareeb was Kuwait's second ranked tennis player. 

He played a competitive match against world No. 1 Roger Federer in the second round of the 2006 Dubai Tennis Championships, though he lost in straight sets. Ranked No. 488 at the time of the match, Ghareeb was expected to offer little resistance to Federer, but in a surprisingly competitive match, Al Ghareeb led 5–3 in the first set, and 3–2 in the second, before succumbing 7–6, 6–4.  According to Federer, Al Ghareeb was "definitely the better player and I think only my experience helped me get through."

Al Ghareeb did not make a significant breakthrough at a top-level event, though in the 2007 Dubai Tennis Championships he won a set from Top 10 player Tomáš Berdych before losing 3–6, 6–3, 6–2.  
Al Ghareeb again received a wild-card to Dubai in 2008, losing 6–4, 6–0 in the first round to the fifth seed Nikolay Davydenko. Once again, he received a wild card in 2009, losing 7–5, 4–6, 4–6 in the first round to third seed Gilles Simon. Simon praised his opponent's play and expressed surprise at his low ranking, saying that Al Ghareeb "has a strange ranking, 400 or so, with his game, it's just unbelievable."

In 2007, he led the Kuwaiti team in its most successful Davis Cup season, reaching the Asia/Oceania Group II final with victories over Iran and Indonesia, before losing the division championship match to the Philippines in a 0–5 sweep. As of February 2018, Ghareeb had a 67–31 record in Davis Cup play for Kuwait (50-13 in singles), and was its longest-standing member.

ATP Challenger and ITF Futures finals

Singles: 10 (5–5)

Doubles: 19 (12–7)

References

External links
 
 

1980 births
Kuwaiti male tennis players
Living people
Tennis players at the 1998 Asian Games
Tennis players at the 2006 Asian Games
Tennis players at the 2014 Asian Games
Asian Games competitors for Kuwait
Islamic Solidarity Games medalists in tennis